Thomas Eugen Gompf (born March 17, 1939 in Dayton, Ohio) is an American former diver. He represented the United States at the 1964 Summer Olympics in Tokyo, where he received a bronze medal in men's 10 metre platform.

Gompf's memoir, "A Life Aloft" was published by CG Sports Publishing in November 2021.

See also
 List of members of the International Swimming Hall of Fame

References

External links
 

1939 births
Living people
Divers at the 1964 Summer Olympics
Olympic bronze medalists for the United States in diving
Sportspeople from Dayton, Ohio
American male divers
Medalists at the 1964 Summer Olympics
20th-century American people
21st-century American people